Edin Ramčić (born 1 August 1970) is a Bosnian retired football midfielder.

Club career
He came to Belgium as a virtually unknown player, but managed to become captain of AA Gent in a few years time. At Gent, he played alongside compatriot Suvad Katana in the centre of defense.

International career
Ramčić made his debut for Bosnia and Herzegovina in a December 1996 friendly match away against Brazil and has earned a total of 6 caps, scoring no goals. His final international was an October 1998 European Championship qualification match against Lithuania.

References

External links

1970 births
Living people
Association football midfielders
Yugoslav footballers
Bosnia and Herzegovina footballers
Bosnia and Herzegovina international footballers
NK Iskra Bugojno players
NK Istra 1961 players
K.A.A. Gent players
R.W.D. Molenbeek players
K.V. Oostende players
S.C. Eendracht Aalst players
FC Nitra players
Yugoslav Second League players
Belgian Pro League players
Challenger Pro League players
Belgian Third Division players
2. Liga (Slovakia) players
Bosnia and Herzegovina expatriate footballers
Expatriate footballers in Belgium
Bosnia and Herzegovina expatriate sportspeople in Belgium
Expatriate footballers in Slovakia
Bosnia and Herzegovina expatriate sportspeople in Slovakia
Bosnia and Herzegovina football managers
K.V. Oostende managers
Bosnia and Herzegovina expatriate football managers
Expatriate football managers in Belgium